The 1983 Corby District Council election took place on 5 May 1983 to elect members of Corby District Council in Northamptonshire, England. This was on the same day as other local elections. The Labour Party retained overall control of the council, which it had gained at the previous election in 1979.

Ward-by-Ward Results

Central Ward (3 seats)

Danesholme Ward (3 seats)

East Ward (2 seats)

Hazelwood Ward (3 seats)

Kingswood Ward (3 seats)

Lloyds Ward (3 seats)

Lodge Park Ward (3 seats)

Rural East Ward (1 seat)

Rural North Ward (1 seat)

Rural West Ward (1 seat)

Shire Lodge Ward (2 seats)

West Ward (2 seats)

References

1983 English local elections
1983
1980s in Northamptonshire